Lyndall Jarvis is a South African model and television presenter.  Born and raised in Cape Town, she is the daughter of an English mother and a South African father. She started modelling at the age of 5. In 2009, FHM South Africa named her as their Sexiest Woman of the Year. She provided the likeness of the enemy character Laughing Octopus in the 2008 video game Metal Gear Solid 4: Guns of the Patriots.

In 2014, Jarvis married South African professional surfer Jordy Smith.

References

Living people
People from Cape Town
South African female models
South African television presenters
South African television personalities
1989 births
South African women television presenters